Owen D. Leib (c. 1803 - June 17, 1848) was a Democratic member of the U.S. House of Representatives from Pennsylvania.

Biography
Leib was born in Pennsylvania.  He studied medicine and commenced practice in Catawissa, Pennsylvania.

Leib was elected as a Democrat to the Twenty-ninth Congress.  He served as chairman of the United States House Committee on Expenditures in the Department of War.  He died in Catawissa in 1848.

Sources

The Political Graveyard

1883 deaths
Physicians from Pennsylvania
Democratic Party members of the United States House of Representatives from Pennsylvania
Year of birth uncertain